Worth Bryan Yancey (July 3, 1879 – August 26, 1912) was an American minor league baseball player and American football coach.

References

External links
 
 

1879 births
1912 deaths
Bethany Bison football coaches
Baseball players from Kentucky